The following lists events that happened during 1912 in Chile.

Incumbents
President of Chile: Ramón Barros Luco

Events

June
4 June – The Socialist Workers' Party (Chile) is founded.

Births
9 February – Edgardo Enríquez (d. 1996)
23 June – César Barros (d. 1992)
16 August – Elsa del Campillo (d. 2009)
27 August – Yoya Martínez (d. 2009)

Deaths 
9 July – Juan José Latorre (b. 1846)
30 October – Alejandro Gorostiaga (b. 1840)

References 

 
Years of the 20th century in Chile
Chile